David John Grant (born September 17, 1965) is a former professional American football defensive end who played six seasons in the National Football League (NFL) for the Cincinnati Bengals, Tampa Bay Buccaneers, and Green Bay Packers. He also pledged Kappa Alpha Psi,  Epsilon Chi chapter.

Raised in Belleville, New Jersey, Grant graduated in 1983 from Belleville High School.

References

1965 births
Living people
Belleville High School (New Jersey) alumni
People from Belleville, New Jersey
Players of American football from New Jersey
Sportspeople from Essex County, New Jersey
American football defensive ends
West Virginia Mountaineers football players
Cincinnati Bengals players
Tampa Bay Buccaneers players
Green Bay Packers players